The 2015 edition of the Women's Handball Tournament of the African Games was the 9th, organized by the African Handball Confederation and played under the auspices of the International Handball Federation, the handball sport governing body. The tournament was held from 10 to 19 September 2015 at the Palais des Sports Kintélé in Brazzaville, Republic of Congo, contested by 11 national teams and won by Angola.

Format
The 11 teams were divided into four groups (Groups A+B+C+D) for the preliminary round.
Round robin for the preliminary round; the top two teams of each group advanced to the quarterfinals.
From there on a knockout system was used until the final.

Draw

Group stage 
Times given below are in UTC+1.

Group A

Group B

Group C

Group D

Knockout stage
All matches were played in: Palais des Sports Kintélé, Brazzaville

* walkover win

Quarter-finals

Semi-finals

Bronze medal match

Gold medal match

Final standings

References

External links
Tournament profile at todor66.com

Handball at the 2015 African Games
Women's handball in the Republic of the Congo
2015 in women's handball